Joya Sherrill (August 20, 1924 – June 28, 2010) was an American jazz vocalist and children's television show host.

Sherrill was born in Bayonne, New Jersey on August 20, 1924. Her first ambition was to become a writer: she was the editor of her school paper. She had a sister, Alice.

Sherrill began her career with Duke Ellington in July 1942 when she was seventeen. After a period at Wilberforce University, she rejoined in 1944 and remained with Ellington until 1946 when she left to marry Richard Guilmenot. Ellington considered her one of his favorite singers. "I never really left the band. I did recordings and special occasions. Duke would call me for jobs once a year at least," Sherrill told John S. Wilson in 1979. Sherrill also performed with Ellingtonians Ray Nance and Rex Stewart for many years. She worked with Ellington on the television broadcast of A Drum Is a Woman (1957), and toured the USSR with Benny Goodman in 1962. The album Joya Sherrill Sings Duke features Ellingtonians performing in support.

From 1970, Sherrill hosted a children's television show, Time for Joya, later called Joya's Fun School. This was recorded for a few years, but was rerun until 1982. In the mid-1970s, she accompanied her husband when he went to Iran for his work. There, she had her own television program, which was broadcast live. She returned to singing in New York near the end of that decade. Her husband died in 1989; they had a son and a daughter. Sherrill died from leukemia at home in Great Neck, New York on June 28, 2010.

Discography

As leader
 Sugar and Spice with Luther Henderson (Columbia, 1962)
 Joya Sherrill Sings Duke (20th Century Fox, 1965)
 Black Beauty: The Duke in Mind by Joya Sherrill with Arne Domnérus (Phontastic, 1995)

As guest
 Sammy Davis Jr. Sammy Jumps with Joya (Design, 1957)
 Duke Ellington My People (Contact, 1964)
 Duke Ellington Duke Ellington's Greatest (RCA Victor, 1954)

References

1924 births
2010 deaths
American women jazz singers
American jazz singers
Singers from New Jersey
Musicians from Bayonne, New Jersey
Duke Ellington Orchestra members
American children's television presenters